The 1959 Cotton Bowl Classic was the 23rd edition of the college football bowl game, played at the Cotton Bowl in Dallas, Texas, on Thursday, January 1. Part of the 1958–59 bowl game season, it matched the independent and sixth-ranked Air Force Falcons and the #10  TCU Horned Frogs of the Southwest Conference (SWC).

This was the first tie in the game in eleven years, and the first scoreless game in twelve years.

Teams

Air Force

Undefeated Air Force had a tie during the regular season, 13–13 to Iowa; the Hawkeyes went on to win the Big Ten Conference and the Rose Bowl. The Falcons were ranked in the polls for the seventh straight week, #8 for the second straight week, and were making their first-ever bowl appearance.

TCU

TCU was unbeaten in Southwest Conference until a 20–13 loss to SMU in the last game of the season. The Horned Frogs had also spent seven weeks in the polls, though they were unranked going into this game. Coincidentally, they also had played Iowa, but lost 17–0. This was TCU's fourth bowl game in seven years and were favored by eight points.

Game summary
CST kickoff.

In the end, it was six lost fumbles (out of 13 in total) and five missed field goals that decided the scoreless outcome. The Falcons at one point had the ball at TCU's 6-yard line before being stuffed, but when they tried to kick a field goal from the 12, George Pupich's kick sailed wide left. Pupich missed two more (one from 34 and the other from 52) while TCU missed two of their own.

TCU went 3 for 11 on passing for a woeful 37 yards but had 190 yards rushing on 48 attempts. Air Force barely did better with 12 for 23 passing for 91 yards and two interceptions. Both teams finished with over 227 yards yet had more punts (16) then points. Dave Phillips of Air Force and Jack Spikes of TCU were named Outstanding Players.

Statistics
{| class=wikitable style="text-align:center"
! Statistics !!TCU!! Air Force
|-
| First Downs || 9|| 13
|-
| Yards Rushing|| 190|| 140
|-
| Yards Passing || 37|| 91
|-
| Total Yards || 227|| 231
|-
|Punts-Average ||9–38.4|| 7–38.1
|-
|Fumbles-Lost ||8–3|| 5–3
|-
|Interceptions|| 0|| 2
|-
|Penalties-Yards ||8–61||3–15
|-
|}

References

External links
Cotton Bowl Classic – January 1, 1959

Cotton Bowl Classic
Cotton Bowl Classic
Air Force Falcons football bowl games
TCU Horned Frogs football bowl games
Cotton Bowl Classic
Cotton Bowl